Ananya Panday (born 30 October 1998) is an Indian actress who primarily works in Hindi films. The daughter of actor Chunky Panday, she began her acting career in 2019 with roles in the teen film Student of the Year 2 and the comedy Pati Patni Aur Woh. These performances earned her the Filmfare Award for Best Female Debut. This was followed by several poorly received films, but her performance in the drama Gehraiyaan (2022) was better received.

Early life and family 
Panday was born on 30 October 1998 to actor Chunky Panday and costume designer Bhavana Pandey in Mumbai, Maharashtra. She has a younger sister named Rysa. Her grandfather Sharad Panday, was an Indian heart surgeon. Her uncle Chikki Panday is a businessperson and her aunt Deanne Pandey is a wellness coach.

She studied at Dhirubhai Ambani International School until 2017. She participated in Vanity Fairs Le Bal des débutantes event in Paris in 2017.

Career 
Panday made her acting debut in 2019 with the teen film Student of the Year 2, co-starring Tiger Shroff and Tara Sutaria, which was produced by Dharma Productions. Writing for Scroll.in, Nandini Ramnath felt that Panday showed potential in an unremarkable film. The film underperformed at the box office. Panday next starred in Pati Patni Aur Woh (2019), a remake of the 1978 film of the same name, alongside Kartik Aaryan and Bhumi Pednekar. She played a secretary who indulges in an affair with a married man, which was portrayed by Ranjeeta Kaur in the original. India Today mentioned that Pandey is "bland and boring with no spice." Panday won the Filmfare Award for Best Female Debut for her performance in both Student of the Year 2 and Pati Patni Aur Woh.

In 2020, Panday appeared in the action film Khaali Peeli, starring Ishaan Khatter. The film was released digitally on Zee Plex. She next appeared alongside Deepika Padukone and Siddhant Chaturvedi in the 2022 romantic drama Gehraiyaan, which released on Amazon Prime Video. Anna M. M. Vetticad from Firstpost wrote, "The surprise in this ensemble is Ananya Panday who brings a gravitas to Tia's confusion and innocence that makes you wonder why she chose to debut with the hollow gloss of Student of the Year 2". Her final release of the year came with Vijay Deverakonda in Puri Jagannadh's action film Liger, a bilingual production in Hindi and Telugu. The film was a critical and commercial failure, with Panday's performance being panned.
 
Panday will next appear in the coming-of-age film Kho Gaye Hum Kahan alongside Chaturvedi and Adarsh Gourav, and in the spiritual sequel Dream Girl 2 alongside Ayushmann Khurrana. She will also star in Vikramaditya Motwane's next film.

Media image 

Panday has frequently combated negative attention and online trolling, for being a beneficiary of nepotism within the Hindi film industry. She said, "It isn't as easy as people say it is. If you have access and don't have the talent to back it up, people won't invest their money in you. Having said that, I do believe nepotism exists and it exists in all industries, not just Bollywood." In 2019, she launched an initiative named So Positive to create awareness about social media bullying, prevent negativity and build a positive community. At the Economic Times Awards 2019, the project was named Initiative of the Year. 

Panday is the celebrity endorser for several brands including Lakme and Gillette Venus. She has subsequently ranked in Times' 50 Most Desirable Women list. She ranked 37th in 2019 and 31st in 2020.

Filmography

Films 

 All films are in Hindi unless otherwise noted.

Music video

Awards and nominations

References

External links 
 
  

1998 births
Living people
Actresses from Mumbai

Indian film actresses
Indian Hindus
Actresses in Hindi cinema
Actresses in Telugu cinema
Filmfare Awards winners
International Indian Film Academy Awards winners
Zee Cine Awards winners
21st-century Indian actresses